Kadugli, also Katcha-Kadugli-Miri or Central Kadu, is a Kadu language or dialect cluster spoken in Kordofan. Stevenson treats the varieties as dialects of one language, and they share a single ISO code, though Schadeberg (1989) treats them as separate languages.

Dialects
There are five commonly cited varieties. Three of them are rather divergent, on the verge of being distinct languages:
Katcha (Tolubi, Dholubi)
Kadugli proper (Dakalla, Talla, Dhalla, Toma Ma Dalla, Kudugli, Morta)
Miri
However, they share a single orthography and use the same literacy materials (Ethnologue). 

Of the two other commonly cited varieties, Damba is somewhat closer to Kadugli, while Tumma appears to be a (sub)dialect of Katcha.

Villages in which the dialects are spoken according to the 22nd edition of Ethnologue:
Katcha dialect: Belanya, Dabakaya, Farouq, Kafina, Katcha, and Tuna villages
Kadugli dialect: ’Daalimo, Kadugli, Kulba, Murta, Takko, and Thappare villages
Miri dialect: Hayar al-Nimr, Kadoda, Kasari, Kuduru, Kya, Luba, Miri Bara, Miri Guwa, Nyimodu, Sogolle, Tulluk, and Umduiu villages

Phonology

Consonants 

 [b] is heard as an allophone of /p/.

Vowels

External links 
 Katcha-English Dictionary (one of the Kadu languages)
Katcha, Kadugli, and Miri basic lexicon at the Global Lexicostatistical Database

References

Languages of Sudan
Kadu languages